"What Am I Doing Here" is a song written and recorded by Canadian country rock group Blue Rodeo. Released in June 1991, it was the third single from their third album, Casino. The song peaked at number 33 on the RPM Country Tracks chart, number 17 on the Adult Contemporary chart and number 41 on the Top Singles chart.

Chart performance

References

1991 singles
Blue Rodeo songs
1990 songs
Songs written by Greg Keelor
Songs written by Jim Cuddy